Northeast Film Studio was one of the first formally established movie production company in the northeast part of China.

Early history
After the War of Resistance against Japan the studio was established in the Dongbei territory of China.  On October 1, 1946 the studio was relocated to Xingshan in the Nenjiang province, known today as Hegang in  the Heilongjiang province.  At the time it is the first known studio established by a communist party.

Separation
From here the film talents and animation talents would separate.  The surrendering of Japan in World War II caused the Manchukuo Film Association to split.  The parts that were sanctioned by the Chinese government would integrate with the Yan'an Film Studio and the Northeast Film Studio.  The War of Liberation would break out in 1949 forcing the studio to move to Changchun.  By 1955 the Northeast Film Studio technically no longer exist, since China's Ministry of Culture would officially rename the new combined entity as Changchun Film Studio.

The animators, mostly the group that worked with Chinese animation such as the Emperor's Dream would move to Shanghai.  The Wan brothers and the talents of Central Academy of Fine Arts, the Art Institute of Suzhou and many other big-name artists would all be concentrated in this studio for the first time to form the Shanghai Animation Film Studio.

See also
History of Chinese Animation
Cinema of China
Chinese Animation

References

Chinese film studios
Film production companies of China
Defunct film and television production companies of China
Companies with year of establishment missing
Changchun Film Studio